Felix Danner (born 24 July 1985) is a German handball player for HBW Balingen-Weilstetten.

References

1985 births
Living people
German male handball players
Sportspeople from Freiburg im Breisgau